Robert Francis Furchgott (June 4, 1916 – May 19, 2009) was a Nobel Prize-winning American biochemist who contributed to the discovery of nitric oxide as a transient cellular signal in mammalian systems.

Early life and education
Furchgott was born in Charleston, South Carolina, to Arthur Furchgott (December 1884 – January 1971), a department store owner, and Pena (Sorentrue) Furchgott. He graduated with from the University of North Carolina at Chapel Hill in 1937 with a degree in chemistry and went on to earn a Ph.D in biochemistry at Northwestern University in 1940.

Career

Furchgott was faculty member and professor of pharmacology at Cornell University Medical College from 1940 to 1949, at Washington University School of Medicine from 1949 to 1956, at SUNY Brooklyn from 1956 to 1989, and at the University of Miami from 1989 through the end of his career.

In 1978, Furchgott discovered a substance in endothelial cells that relaxes blood vessels, calling it endothelium-derived relaxing factor (EDRF). By 1986, he had worked out EDRF's nature and mechanism of action, and determined that EDRF was in fact nitric oxide (NO), an important compound in many aspects of cardiovascular physiology. This research is important in explaining a wide variety of neuronal, cardiovascular, and general physiologic processes of central importance in human health and disease.

In addition to receiving the Nobel Prize in Physiology or Medicine for the discovery of nitric oxide as a new cellular signal in 1998 with Louis Ignarro and Ferid Murad,

 Furchgott's discovery that Nitric Oxide causes blood vessels to dilate, provided a long-sought explanation for the therapeutic effects of Nitroglycerin used to treat Angina pectoris and was later instrumental in the development of the erectile dysfunction treatment drug Viagra.

In 1991, Furchgott received a Gairdner Foundation International Award for his groundbreaking discoveries. He also received the Albert Lasker Award for Basic Medical Research in 1996 and the Golden Plate Award of the American Academy of Achievement in 1999 with Ferid Murad.

Personal life
Furchgott was Jewish and lived most of his married and career life in Woodmere, New York on Long Island. He was married to Lenore Mandelbaum (February 1915 – April 1983) from 1941 until her death at age 68. They had three daughters: Jane, Terry, and Susan. His daughter, Susan, was an artist in the San Francisco counter-culture and co-founder of the Kerista Commune.

Furchgott spent his later years with Margaret Gallagher Roth, who died March 14, 2006. He served as a professor emeritus at the State University of New York Downstate Medical Center. In 2008, he moved to Seattle's Ravenna neighborhood.

Death
Furchgott died on May 19, 2009, in Seattle. He is survived by his three daughters, four grandchildren, and three great-grandchildren.

See also 
 List of Jewish Nobel laureates

Further reading 
 Anon. (2009) "Obituary: Robert Furchgott," The Telegraph (online), May 26, 2009, see,  accessed 11 August 2015.

References

External links
 The Robert F. Furchgott Society
 
 His laboratory's webpage

1916 births
2009 deaths
Nobel laureates in Physiology or Medicine
American Nobel laureates
Nobel laureates affiliated with Missouri
American pharmacologists
Jewish American scientists
Jewish chemists
People from Charleston, South Carolina
SUNY Downstate Medical Center faculty
Washington University in St. Louis faculty
Cornell University faculty
Members of the United States National Academy of Sciences
Recipients of the Albert Lasker Award for Basic Medical Research
Northwestern University alumni
University of North Carolina at Chapel Hill alumni
Washington University School of Medicine faculty
University of Miami faculty